The Yokosuka E14Y (Allied reporting name Glen) was an Imperial Japanese Navy reconnaissance seaplane transported aboard and launched from Japanese submarine aircraft carriers such as the  during World War II. The Japanese Navy designation was "Type 0 Small Reconnaissance Seaplane" (零式小型水上偵察機).

Design and development

Operational history

The E14Y was used for several Japanese reconnaissance missions during the Pacific War.

On 26 February 1942 the Japanese submarine I-25, under the command of Captain Akiji Tagami, was off the northern tip of King Island in Bass Strait off the coast of Victoria, Australia, when an E14Y was launched on a reconnaissance flight over the Port of Melbourne. The pilot and observer/gunner were in the air for three hours, during which time they successfully flew over Port Phillip Bay and observed the ships at anchor off Melbourne before returning to land on its floats beside the submarine, where it was winched aboard and disassembled.

The E14Y is the only Japanese aircraft to overfly New Zealand during World War II (and only the second enemy aircraft after the German Friedrichshafen FF.33 'Wölfchen' during World War I). On 8 March 1942 Warrant Officer Nobuo Fujita photographed the Allied build-up in Wellington harbour in a "Glen" launched from the Japanese submarine I-25. On 13 March he flew over Auckland, before the I-25 proceeded to Australia. On the night of 24/25 May Warrant Officer Susumo Ito flew a "Glen" over Auckland from the Japanese submarine I-21. Just days later, in the same aircraft, Ito flew the reconnaissance flight preceding the sole Japanese attack on Sydney Harbour in which 21 seamen were killed when  sank on 1 June 1942.

Type A1 submarine I-9 was caught off the New Zealand coast in early 1943; however, no Japanese aircraft was observed, and any records of overflights were lost when the submarine was sunk.

The E14Y also has the distinction of being the only submarine-based aircraft to drop bombs on the United States during World War II, in an incident known as The Lookout Air Raid. On 9 September 1942 , Chief Warrant Officer  Nobuo Fujita, a pilot in the Japanese Imperial Navy, and his crewman, Petty Officer Shoji Okuda, surfaced in submarine I-25 off the coast of Oregon near Brookings. The seaplane had folding wings and was transported in a watertight capsule attached to the deck of the submarine. The bombs – 76 kg (168 lb) incendiaries intended to cause forest fires – caused no injuries or real damage.

A total of 126 E14Ys were produced.

Surviving aircraft
Aviation History magazine reported in the November 2008 issue that divers had found airplane parts in the Akibasan Maru wreck, a Japanese cargo ship sunk in the Kwajalein Atoll on 20 January 1944, and rediscovered in 1965. The parts (including wings and floats) have been finally identified (April 2008) as belonging to two E14Y1 "Glen" floatplanes, through the use of photographs from the wreck and comparisons with original technical drawings and a captured technical manual.

Specifications (E14Y)

See also

References

Notes

Bibliography
 .
 Green, William. War Planes of the Second World War, Volume Six: Floatplanes. London: Macdonald & Co (Publishers), 1962.
 Ishiguro, Ryusuke and Tadeusz Januszewski. Kugisho E14Y "Glen". Sandomierz, Poland/Redbourn, UK: MMP Books, 2010. .
 Jackson, Robert. The Encyclopedia of Military Aircraft. Bath, UK: Parragon Books, 2006. .
 Januszewski, Tadeusz. Japanese Submarine Aircraft. Sandomierz, Poland/Redbourn, UK: Mushroom Model Publications, 2002. .

 Thorpe, Donald W. Japanese Naval Air Force Camouflage and Markings World War II. Fallbrook, California: Aero Publishers, 1977. .

External links

 Yokosuka E14Y Allied Code Name: "Glen" – www.combinedfleet.com
 Yokosuka E14Y (Glen) including the fire-bombing, August 1942 – Pacific Wrecks

Floatplanes
E14Y, Yokosuka
E14Y
E14Y, Yokosuka
Submarine-borne aircraft
Low-wing aircraft
Single-engined tractor aircraft
Aircraft first flown in 1939